Nicolas-Gabriel Dupuis (1698, Paris – 26 March 1771, Paris) was a French engraver. He sometimes signed his name as "Dupuis le Jeune" or "Dupuis Junior", to distinguish himself from his older brother, Charles Dupuis, who was also an engraver.

Biography 
He and his brother both received their training from Gaspard Duchange, who offered him his daughter in marriage. He perfected his skills in England, where the Rococo style was in fashion and French artists were in great demand.

In 1751, he was given the approval of the Académie royale de peinture et de sculpture and became a member three years later.

He took numerous students; notably Louis Michel Halbou and Charles-François-Adrien Macret, as well as the Spaniards, Manuel Salvador Carmona and Pasqual Pere Moles.

Among his notable illustrations are those created for the complete edition of the Fables of Jean de La Fontaine, published by Saillant et Desaint (1755-1759), after drawings by Jean-Baptiste Oudry and others.

Selected works
 La Henriade by Voltaire, frontispiece to the sixth song, after Jean-François de Troy
 Aeneas Saving her Father from the Burning of Troy, after Charles André van Loo
 The Adoration of the Kings, after Paolo Veronese  
 The Virgin and Child Jesus, after Annibale Carracci

References

Further reading 
 Collection of prints from the most famous paintings in the Dresden Gallery, Christian Heinrich Hagenmüller, Dresden, two volumes, 1753 and 1757.
 General idea of a collection of prints with a dissertation on the origin of the engraving and on picture books, Johann Paul Kraus, Leipzig and Vienna, 1771.

External links 

1695 births
1771 deaths
18th-century engravers
French engravers